Omar Núñez (full name: Omar Yasser Núñez Munguía) is an Olympic swimmer from Nicaragua. He swam for Nicaragua at the:
Olympics: 2008, 2012
World Championships: 2001, 2003, 2005, 2007, 2009, 2011
Pan American Games: 2003, 2007, 2011
Central American and Caribbean Games: 2002,2006
Short Course Worlds: 2008, 2010
 Central American Sports Games: 1997,2001,2006 (Silver and Bronze Medals),2010

External links

Living people
Nicaraguan male swimmers
Olympic swimmers of Nicaragua
Swimmers at the 2008 Summer Olympics
Swimmers at the 2012 Summer Olympics
Swimmers at the 2003 Pan American Games
Swimmers at the 2007 Pan American Games
Swimmers at the 2011 Pan American Games
Pan American Games competitors for Nicaragua
Year of birth missing (living people)